Dowlabad (also Romanized as Dowlābād) is a village in Nakhlestan Rural District, in the Central District of Kahnuj County, Kerman Province, Iran. At the 2006 census, its population was 559, in 120 families.

References 

Populated places in Kahnuj County